The W&P Subdivision is a rail line between Washington, Pennsylvania (formerly ran until Wheeling, West Virginia), and Hazelwood, Pittsburgh, Pennsylvania. Formerly operated by the Baltimore & Ohio Railroad and later CSX Transportation, this line is now operated by Allegheny Valley Railroad. The Allegheny Valley Railroad leased the line from CSX in 2003 and acquired it in 2019. The section from Pittsburgh to Washington, PA is still in use, however, Washington to Wheeling, WV has been abandoned since 1989.

See also

 Glenwood B&O Railroad Bridge
 Whitehall Tunnel
 Baltimore and Ohio Short Line Railroad
 Hempfield Railroad
 P&W Subdivision

References

CSX Transportation lines
Rail infrastructure in Pennsylvania
Baltimore and Ohio Railroad lines